Torpado was an Italian professional cycling team that existed from 1951 to 1962. It was sponsored by the bicycle manufacturing company of the same name. 

The team competed in 11 consecutive editions of the Giro d'Italia, from 1952 to 1962, where they achieved nine stage wins and having a best general classification result of 4th by Cleto Maule in 1956. Maule also notably won the 1955 Giro di Lombardia with the team.

References

Defunct cycling teams based in Italy
1951 establishments in Italy
1962 disestablishments in Italy
Cycling teams disestablished in 1962